Philip Carey Building is a historic warehouse building located at Charlotte, Mecklenburg County, North Carolina, USA. It was built in 1907–1908, and is a two-story, brick building with elaborate Victorian Romanesque style brickwork.

It was added to the National Register of Historic Places in 1984.

References

Commercial buildings on the National Register of Historic Places in North Carolina
Romanesque Revival architecture in North Carolina
Commercial buildings completed in 1908
Buildings and structures in Charlotte, North Carolina
National Register of Historic Places in Mecklenburg County, North Carolina
1908 establishments in North Carolina